is a former Japanese football player. He played for Japan national team.

Club career
Tanaka was born on June 15, 1933. When he was a Chuo University student, he won the 2nd place at 1955 Emperor's Cup with Ken Naganuma, Masao Uchino and so on. After graduating from university, he played for Toyo Industries.

National team career
On January 2, 1955, when Tanaka was a Chuo University student, he debuted for Japan national team against Burma. He played 4 games for Japan in 1955.

National team statistics

References

External links
 
 Japan National Football Team Database

1933 births
Living people
Chuo University alumni
Japanese footballers
Japan international footballers
Sanfrecce Hiroshima players
Association football forwards